Senator Saulsbury may refer to:

Eli M. Saulsbury (1817–1893), U.S. Senator from Delaware
Gove Saulsbury (1815–1881), Delaware State Senate
Willard Saulsbury Jr. (1861–1927), U.S. Senator from Delaware
Willard Saulsbury Sr. (1820–1893), U.S. Senator from Delaware